Diébougou is a department or commune of Bougouriba Province in south-western Burkina Faso. Its capital is the town of Diebougou. According to the 2019 census the department has a total population of 63,280.

Towns and villages
DiébougouBalignarBamakoBaplaBapla-BiriforBarindiaDankobléDanko-TanzouDiasserKoleparKonsablaLokodja
MebarMouléMoutoriMouvieloNaborganeNavielganeSegréSorgonTampéTansiéTiediaVoukoun

References

Departments of Burkina Faso
Bougouriba Province